Chattikulam is a small high range village near Chalakudy in Thrissur district, Kerala, India. It is 9 km from Chalakudy on the way to Vellikulangara.

Timber depot
A timber depot is located in Chattikulam and this is the heart of this village.

Administration
The kodassery grama panchayath and Chattikulam village office is located near to the Timber Depot.

Chattikulam has one forest nursery. This village has one Post office and post code is 680721.

Demographics
Population is 12,575, 5970 men and 6,605 women. Includes farmers, government employees, daily wage employees, etc..

Education
This village has one nursery school or Anganvadi in tramway road towards thazhoor. 

Chattikulam village comes under Chalakudy taluk.

Economy
Left side irrigation canal from Thumboormuzhi water reservoir passes through Chattikulam village and this is a blessing for the farmers in this village.

Transportation
Chattikulam check-post is the main junction in this village.

Private and public bus transportation facilities are available. Private  ar and auto rickshaw's are available to hire.

References

Villages in Thrissur district